Apyrrothrix araxes, also known as the dull firetip and the golf-club skipper, is a North American butterfly in the family Hesperiidae.  It is the only butterfly in the subfamily Pyrrhopyginae that occurs in the United States.  They usually perch with their wings fully or partly open.  Adults are very fond of flowers.  Their flight is direct and quite fast, usually flying high above trees.

Description
The upper side of the wings is brown with the fore wings having several glassy white spots.  The underside of the wings is brown with the body and basal area of the wings bright yellow-orange.

Habitat
The Dull Firetip lives in habitats such as southwestern oak woodlands.

Flight
Adults may be seen from August to November (they are most common in September).

Life cycle
The larvae live in a folded-over leaf nest.  The yellow-banded larva is red-brown with white-hairs.  The head is black with white and orange hairs.  The pupa is brownish-red with maroon joints and the abdomen dull orange.  It is covered with white hairs (except on the wing cases) and has orange hairs on the top of the head.  The partially grown larva builds a small nest on the host plant where it will overwinter.  It has 1 brood per year.

Host Plants
Here is a list of host plants that Apyrrothrix araxes uses:

 Emory Oak, Quercus emoryi
 Toumey Oak, Quercus toumeyi
 Arizona White Oak, Quercus arizonica
 Gray Oak, Quercus grisea

References

Butterflies of North America
Pyrrhopyge